Chaetopappa parryi,  called the Parry's lazy daisy, or Parry's leastdaisy, is a North American species of plants in the family Asteraceae. It is native to northeastern Mexico (Coahuila, Nuevo León, San Luis Potosí, Tamaulipas) and to the Big Bend region of western Texas.

References

External links
Tropicos.org: photo of herbarium specimen collected in Coahuila

parryi
Flora of Northeastern Mexico
Flora of Texas
Plants described in 1880
Taxa named by Asa Gray